The NIH Office of Technology Transfer (OTT) plays a strategic role by supporting the patenting and licensing efforts of our NIH ICs. OTT protects, monitors, markets and manages the wide range of NIH discoveries, inventions, and other intellectual property as mandated by the Federal Technology Transfer Act and related legislation.

To accomplish its mission, OTT staff provide management and oversight of the collection and disbursement of royalties, monitor and enforce patent rights and licensing agreements, coordinate the payment of all patent annuities, market available technologies to the private sector, provide legal docketing services, and provide technology development systems support and expertise to the NIH Technology Transfer community.

The NIH and its role in technology transfer 
The NIH is a leader in medical breakthroughs, with the discovery of new biological molecules, processes and pathways, novel medical technologies, and innovative applications of existing medical knowledge. Many important medical breakthroughs begin in the research laboratories at the NIH, where scientists take the first step in the amelioration and curing of disease. Technology transfer at the NIH begins in these laboratories and makes these discoveries available to improve public health through licensing and collaboration agreements with the private sector. The NIH technology transfer function moves medical innovation from the benchtop through additional research and development, testing, regulatory approval, manufacturing, and finally to distribution as a medical product which will improve the health of everyone.

Technology transfer at the NIH is a process which transfers medical knowledge from NIH laboratories to other organizations for the purpose of developing that knowledge into medical products to enhance the public health. In the course of their research, NIH scientists often make important medical discoveries. These NIH scientists disclose their discoveries to NIH technology transfer specialists who decide if patenting is appropriate, and when a patent is sought, begin to seek appropriate development and commercialization partners and licensees. Inventions developed in the NIH's laboratories are owned by the NIH and are patented as appropriate. Through such resources as Federal Register notices and the NIH's website, potential licensees and collaborators are made aware of NIH inventions, and discussions begin between them and the NIH technology transfer specialist. These discussions then develop into agreement negotiations, with the ultimate goal being a license or other collaboration agreement to develop NIH inventions further into medical products.

Patent prosecution decisions and the negotiation and execution of new licenses, are the responsibility of the individual institutes within the NIH.

NIH OTT mission statement 
The mission of Technology Transfer at National Institutes of Health (NIH) is to facilitate
partnerships with a wide array of stakeholders, and effectively manage the inventions conceived
by scientists working at the NIH and the Centers for Disease Control and Prevention (CDC).
In doing so, NIH Technology Transfer supports the larger NIH mission to seek fundamental
knowledge about the nature and behavior of living systems and the application of that knowledge
to enhance health, lengthen life, and reduce illness and disability.

Working on behalf of the NIH and the CDC – all agencies of the Department of Health and Human
Services (HHS), Technology Transfer offices across the NIH apply responsive, and sometimes
creative approaches to meet the needs of all parties involved, operating with a goal of moving
scientific research and discovery forward for the benefit of public health.

Technology Transfer at NIH:
• Protects U.S. intellectual property and the discoveries conceived by NIH and CDC intramural
researchers. This includes working with researchers to determine if an invention warrants
patent protection, overseeing the filing of Employee Invention Reports (EIRs), and coordinating
the patent filing and prosecution process.

• Serves as a bridge through marketing and communications, connecting the inventive
discoveries made by scientists in the NIH and CDC research programs to commercial partners
with the capability of developing these technologies into products and services to benefit public
health. Without TT, the full potential of these inventions would not be realized, and the public
would not receive the full benefit of these biomedical discoveries.

• Facilitates partnerships with outside parties to allow for collaboration.

• Negotiates licenses and collaborative agreements such as Cooperative Research and
Development Agreements (CRADAs) to ensure the timely development of federal technologies
that contribute to society by driving economic growth and productivity; these collaborations
leverage the strengths of each institution to advance basic and clinical research objectives.

• Monitors the development of these technologies to ensure commercialization milestones are
reached, products are brought to the market, and royalty fees are paid.

• Facilitates the transfer of thousands of research materials and data into and out of NIH.

History 

The NIH Office of Technology Transfer manages all intramural inventions from the NIH and FDA as mandated by the Federal Technology Transfer Act and related legislation. It was established in 1986 subsequent to the Federal Technology Transfer Act as a centralized group to oversee patent and license matters for all of the NIH Institutes and Centers. The office allows both agencies to better license their work for international use.

References

External links 
 ott.nih.gov

National Institutes of Health
Technology transfer